San Pa Pao is a tambon (subdistrict) of San Sai District, in Chiang Mai Province, Thailand. In 2005 it had a population of 3,934 people. The tambon contains six villages.

References

Tambon of Chiang Mai province
Populated places in Chiang Mai province